The acronym ALHS can refer to:

Abraham Lincoln High School (disambiguation)
Avon Lake High School